Asawa Ko, Karibal Ko (International title: Silent Shadow / ) is a Philippine television drama series broadcast by GMA Network. Directed by Mark Sicat dela Cruz, it stars Kris Bernal, Thea Tolentino and Rayver Cruz. It premiered on October 22, 2018 on the network's Afternoon Prime and Sabado Star Power sa Hapon line up replacing Ika-5 Utos. The series concluded on March 2, 2019 with a total of 114 episodes. It was replaced by Dragon Lady in its timeslot.

The series is originally titled as The Betrayed Wife and later Mag-asawa, Magkaribal. The series is streaming online on YouTube.

Premise
Rachel meets Nathan, a gay man who later marries her due to family's pressure. Unhappy and trapped, Nathan plots his fake death and later undergoes to a sexual reassignment and face surgery in another country. Years later, Rachel meets Gavin and falls for him. Gavin has a wife, Venus whom Rachel will eventually find out to be her former husband.

Cast and characters

Lead cast
 Kris Bernal as Rachel Santiago-Bravante
 Thea Tolentino as Venus Hermosa-Bravante / Nathan Bravante / Catriona
Rayver Cruz as Gavin Corpus

Supporting cast
 Lotlot de Leon as Lupita Santiago
 Devon Seron as Maya Santiago
 Jean Saburit as Veronica delos Santos-Bravante
 Ricardo Cepeda  as Lorenzo Bravante
 Maricris Garcia as Allison "Alice S." Bravante
 Matthias Rhoads as Daniel Lindberg
 Phil Noble as Krissy
 Analyn Barro as Tina Santos-Santiago
 Caprice Cayetano as Nicole Belle Bravante

Guest cast
 Jason Abalos as Nathan Bravante / Catriona
 Rob Sy as Arnold dela Cruz
 Alma Moreno as Sarah Corpus
 Juancho Trivino as David Santiago
 Ranty Portento as Andrew
 Alvin Maghanoy as young Nathan Bravante
 Adrian Pascual as teen Nathan
 Ameera Johara as Janice
 Mela Franco Habijan as Mela
 Althea Ablan as young Allison Bravante
 Stanley Abuloc as Kyle Bravante
 Geraldine Villamil as Marie
 Xyruz Cruz as Paolo
 Chrome Prince Cosio as Frank
 David Uy as Stanley
 Rob Moya as Gio
 Andrew Gan as Julio
 Karlo Duterte as Ben
 Mike Liwag as a restaurant manager
 Kiel Rodriguez as Marasigan

Ratings
According to AGB Nielsen Philippines' Nationwide Urban Television Audience Measurement People in television homes, the pilot episode of Asawa Ko Karibal Ko earned a 6.6% rating.

Accolades

References

External links
 
 

2018 Philippine television series debuts
2019 Philippine television series endings
2010s LGBT-related drama television series
Filipino-language television shows
GMA Network drama series
Philippine LGBT-related television shows
Television shows set in the Philippines
Transgender-related television shows